Myllocerus is a genus of oriental broad-nosed weevils in the beetle family Curculionidae. There are at least 330 described species in Myllocerus.

See also
 List of Myllocerus species

References

Further reading

External links

 

Entiminae
Insect pests of millets